The Andrew John Volstead House is the historic house in Granite Falls, Minnesota, of ten-term United States Congressman Andrew Volstead (1860–1947).  It is now managed as a museum and the organizational headquarters of the Granite Falls Historical Society.  Volstead became nationally synonymous with Prohibition in 1919 when, as chairman of the House Judiciary Committee, he was obliged to author the Volstead Act, enabling enforcement of the recently ratified Eighteenth Amendment.  Volstead was a moderate progressive who coauthored the Capper–Volstead Act in 1922, which legalized agricultural cooperatives.

The house was listed on the National Register of Historic Places in 1974 for having national significance in the areas of agriculture, politics/government, and social history.  Two years later the house was declared a National Historical Landmark.

The 1878 home is a wood-frame structure with a large two-story stairwell tower that was added on by Volstead shortly after he purchased the property in 1894.  During Volstead's time, the first floor had a large screened porch; this has now been replaced by an open porch.  The interior is adorned with oak woodwork and stained glass.  Volstead moved to a new home in Granite Falls in 1930.  The first Volstead House remained privately owned until 1974, when it was listed on the National Register and converted into a historic house museum.  Five years later it was donated to the city.

See also
 List of National Historic Landmarks in Minnesota
 National Register of Historic Places listings in Yellow Medicine County, Minnesota

References

External links
Andrew Volstead Home Museum - Granite Falls Historical Society
Andrew John Volstead House – Historic American Buildings Survey

Biographical museums in Minnesota
Historic house museums in Minnesota
Houses completed in 1878
Houses in Yellow Medicine County, Minnesota
Houses on the National Register of Historic Places in Minnesota
Museums in Yellow Medicine County, Minnesota
National Historic Landmarks in Minnesota
National Register of Historic Places in Yellow Medicine County, Minnesota
Wooden houses in the United States